WFDZ 93.5 FM is a radio station licensed to Perry, Florida.  The station broadcasts a country music format and is owned by Dockins Communications, Inc.

References

External links
WFDZ's official website

FDZ
Country radio stations in the United States